Knights Enham is a small village and former civil parish in the Test Valley district of Hampshire, England. It lies 1.4 miles (3.1 km) away from Andover. It is now in the civil parish of Enham Alamein.

References

Villages in Hampshire
Former civil parishes in Hampshire
Test Valley